Crypsitricha agriopa is a species of moth in the family Tineidae. It was described by Edward Meyrick in 1888. This species is endemic to New Zealand.

The wingspan is about 9 mm. The forewings are fuscous with a slender ferruginous streak along the submedian fold, suffusedly margined beneath with whitish-ochreous, and above by three cloudy blackish dots. There are two small black spots on the costa towards the base and there is a black wedge-shaped spot from the costa before the middle, reaching half across wing, followed by an ochreous-white similar spot. The posterior half of the costa narrowly is black, with five small clear ochreous-white spots and there a short longitudinal ferruginous streak in the disc beyond the middle, as well as an irregular, small, white spot in the disc at three-fourths, partially margined above with black. The apex and hindmargin are suffusedly irrorated with blackish. The hindwings are dark grey.

References

Moths described in 1888
Tineidae
Moths of New Zealand
Endemic fauna of New Zealand
Taxa named by Edward Meyrick
Endemic moths of New Zealand